The Song of the Rivers is a 1954 documentary film production by the East Germany film studio DEFA. Dutch filmmaker Joris Ivens was the leading director. The sprawling film celebrates international workers movements along six major rivers: the Volga, Mississippi, Ganges, Nile, Amazon and the Yangtze. Shot in many countries by different film crews, and later edited by Ivens, Song of the Rivers begins with a lyrical montage of landscapes and laborers and proceeds to glorify labor and modern industrial machinery. The musical score is by Dmitri Shostakovich, with lyrics written by Bertolt Brecht, and songs performed by German communism's star Ernst Busch and famous American actor, singer and activist Paul Robeson who also narrates. Song of the Rivers is an ode to international solidarity.

Popularity in communist countries

After World War II, Ivens spent several years in East Germany, where he edited Song of the Rivers, which is said to have been seen by 250 million people in communist countries. A tribute to international trade unionism, the film combines images of life along six great rivers: the Mississippi, the Ganges, the Nile, the Yangtse, the Volga, and the Amazon. Unlike the intimacy of "Power and the Land," another Ivens film, abstract grandiloquence is the keynote. The narrator Paul Robeson states: "Day by day with our hands — yellow, white, or black — we change the face of the earth and the future of mankind." Ivens’s editing gives the film a simple, cumulative force. The longing for unity expressed in Song of the Rivers is apparent throughout the documentary.

References

External links
 

1954 documentary films
1954 films
German black-and-white films
Documentary films about the labor movement
East German films
Films directed by Joris Ivens
German documentary films
Films set in the Amazon
Films set in Egypt
Films set in India
Films set in China
1950s English-language films
1950s German films